The men's 30 kilometre skiathlon cross-country skiing competition at the 2014 Sochi Olympics was held on 9 February 2014 at 14:00 MSK at the Laura Biathlon & Ski Complex. The event is split into half distance classic skiing and half distance skate skiing.

Summary
Dario Cologna from Switzerland won the gold medal. Marcus Hellner, the defending Olympic champion from Sweden, finished second, and Martin Johnsrud Sundby from Norway came third.

For much of the free skiing half of the course about fifteen athletes were skiing together, and only close to the stadium, a group of four, Cologna, Hellner, Sundby and Maxim Vylegzhanin escaped. At the stadium, Cologna escaped and became the champion. Sundby finished third closely ahead of Vylegzhanin, and the Russian delegation filed a protest because he apparently changed the track in the finish area, impeding Vylegzhanin. Sundby was reprimanded but allowed to keep the bronze medal.

Qualification

An athlete with a maximum of 100 FIS distance points (the A standard) will be allowed to compete in both or one of the event (sprint/distance). An athlete with a maximum 120 FIS sprint points will be allowed to compete in the sprint event and 10 km for women or 15 km for men provided their distance points do not exceed 300 FIS points. NOC's who do not have any athlete meeting the A standard can enter one competitor of each sex (known as the basic quota) in only 10 km classical event for women or 15 km classical event for men. They must have a maximum of 300 FIS distance points at the end of qualifying on 20 January 2014. The qualification period began in July 2012.

Competition schedule
All times are (UTC+4).

Results
The race was started at 14:00.

PF = Photo Finish

References

Men's cross-country skiing at the 2014 Winter Olympics
Men's pursuit cross-country skiing at the Winter Olympics